Robert Smith (born 1908, date of death unknown) was a South African boxer. He competed in the men's lightweight event at the 1928 Summer Olympics.

References

1908 births
Year of death missing
South African male boxers
Olympic boxers of South Africa
Boxers at the 1928 Summer Olympics
Place of birth missing
Lightweight boxers